Sundew was a large electrically powered dragline excavator used in mining operations in Rutland and Northamptonshire in the United Kingdom.

Built by Ransomes & Rapier and named after the winning horse of the 1957 Grand National, it began work in a Rutland iron ore quarry belonging to the United Steel Companies (Ore Mining Branch) that year. At the time of its construction Sundew was the largest walking dragline in the world, weighing .

Propulsion was via two large movable feet which could be used to "walk" the dragline forwards and backwards, while directional control was provided by a large circular turntable under the body of the machine.

Sundew remained until operations at the quarry ceased in 1974 and plans were then devised to relocate the machine to a recently opened British Steel Corporation quarry near Corby.  At a cost of £250,000 and taking two years to complete, it was decided that dismantling, moving and reconstructing the machine was not a viable option, and so over an eight-week period in 1974 Sundew walked  from its home in Exton Park near the village of Exton in Rutland to a site north of Corby.  During the walk the dragline crossed three water mains, four water courses, 13 power lines, ten roads, a railway line, two gas mains, seven telephone lines, 74 hedges, and the River Welland before reaching its new home. 

As part of a major restructuring of British Steel in the late 1970s Corby Steelworks was closed down, and there was no longer any need for a large dragline to assist in the recovery of iron ore. On 4 July 1980 Sundew walked to its final resting place and the huge boom was lowered onto a purpose-built earth mound. There it remained for seven years until being scrapped from January to June of 1987. The cab and bucket are preserved at Rutland Railway Museum which is now known as Rocks By Rail – The Living Ironstone Museum. In 2014 the Heritage Lottery Fund awarded £8,100 for the restoration of the cab.

References

 

Mining equipment
Engineering vehicles
Draglines